Margaret A. Burnham (born December 28, 1944) is an American lawyer and academic who is a professor at the Northeastern University School of Law and the founder of the Civil Rights and Restorative Justice Project. She is a Senate-confirmed nominee to be a member of the Civil Rights Cold Case Records Review Board.

Early life and education 
Burnham was born in Birmingham, Alabama in 1944. She earned a Bachelor of Arts degree in history from Tougaloo College and a Bachelor of Laws from the University of Pennsylvania Law School.

Career

Burnham's legal practice included serving as an attorney with the NAACP Legal Defense Fund.

In 1970, Burnham worked with CPUSA lawyer John Abt to defend Angela Davis, her friend since childhood, and later wrote the foreword to Abt's memoir.

In 1977, she became the first female African American  Judge in Massachusetts, serving as an Associate Justice of the Boston Municipal Court until 1982.

In 2008, she was one of the lawyers in a landmark federal lawsuit against Franklin County, Mississippi for their law-enforcement agents' involvement in the 1964 Ku Klux Klan kidnapping, torture and killing of two 19-year-olds, Henry Dee and Charles Eddie Moore.

On June 11, 2021, President Joe Biden nominated Burnham to be a member of the Civil Rights Cold Case Records Review Board. The Senate's Homeland Security committee held hearings on Burnham's nomination on January 13, 2022. The committee favorably reported her nomination on February 2, 2022. Burnham was officially confirmed by the entire Senate via voice vote on February 17, 2022.

Burnham has authored and coauthored numerous articles; and one book, By Hands Now Known, which received a positive review in The New York Times.

Personal life 
Burnham's father was Louis E. Burnham, an activist and journalist. Her sister, Linda Burnham, is also an activist and journalist. Her brother, Charles Burnham, is a violinist and composer. She is also related to Forbes Burnham, the second president of Guyana.

See also
List of African-American jurists
List of first women lawyers and judges in Massachusetts

References

External links

Living people
Northeastern University School of Law faculty
American civil rights lawyers
1944 births
People from Birmingham, Alabama
Tougaloo College alumni
University of Pennsylvania Law School alumni